Forest City Municipal Airport  is a public use airport in Hancock County, Iowa, United States. It is located two nautical miles (4 km) south of the central business district of Forest City, a city in Hancock County and Winnebago County. The airport is owned by the City of Forest City. It serves general aviation for Forest City and the surrounding area. Winnebago Industries operates an IAI Astra for company use with the 5800 runway.  There is no scheduled air service.

Facilities and aircraft 
It has two asphalt paved runways: 15/33 is 5,796 by 100 feet (1,767 x 30 m) and 9/27 is 2,708 by 60 feet (825 x 18 m).

For the 12-month period ending September 18, 2008, the airport had 5,950 general aviation aircraft operations, an average of 16 per day. At that time there were 18 aircraft based at this airport: 78% single-engine, 6% multi-engine, 6% jet, 11% ultralight.

References

External links 
 Forest City (FXY) at Iowa DOT Airport Directory
 

Airports in Iowa
Transportation buildings and structures in Hancock County, Iowa
Transportation buildings and structures in Winnebago County, Iowa